Impact is a live album by Music Inc. led by American jazz trumpeter Charles Tolliver recorded in 1972 and first released on the Enja label.

Track listing
All compositions by Charles Tolliver except as indicated
 "Impact" – 8:05
 "Brilliant Circles" (Stanley Cowell) – 15:29
 "Truth" – 9:04
 "Prayer for Peace" (Cowell) – 15:58
 "Absecretions" (Cowell) – 11:22 Bonus track on CD reissue
 "Our Second Father" – 13:43 Bonus track on CD reissue

Personnel
Charles Tolliver – trumpet
Stanley Cowell – piano
Ron Mathewson – bass
Alvin Queen – drums

References

1972 live albums
Charles Tolliver live albums
Enja Records live albums